The Tallis Scholars is a British professional early music vocal ensemble normally consisting of two singers per part, with a core group of ten singers. They specialise in performing a cappella sacred vocal music.

History
The group was formed in 1973 by Peter Phillips, who in 1972-1975 was an organ scholar at St John's College, Oxford and studied music with David Wulstan and Denis Arnold. Phillips invited the members of chapel choirs from Oxford and Cambridge to form an amateur Renaissance vocal music ensemble, which turned professional after ten years of concert-giving. From the first performance in the Church of St. Mary Magdalen, Oxford on November 3, 1973, Phillips aimed to produce a distinctive sound, influenced by choirs he admired, in particular the renowned Clerkes of Oxenford, directed by David Wulstan. Since winning a Gramophone Award in 1987, the Tallis Scholars have been recognised as one of the world's leading ensembles in Renaissance polyphony.

Concerts
The Tallis Scholars singers tour widely, performing some 70 concerts a year, in Europe, North America, Asia and Australia. In April 1994, they sang Allegri's Miserere mei, Deus in the newly restored Sistine Chapel in Vatican, and performed in February 1994 in the Basilica di Santa Maria Maggiore in Rome to commemorate Palestrina's 400th anniversary.

In 1999, they toured China, giving two concerts in Beijing. In 1998, the Tallis Scholars marked the ensemble's 25th anniversary with a performance in London's National Gallery. At the millennium, they performed in New York City with Paul McCartney. During the 2013-2014 40th-anniversary concert series, the group announced a world tour including the United States, Europe, Australia and New Zealand. The Tallis Scholars started the tour with a concert in St Paul's Cathedral in London for 2000 people.

Recordings
Since March 1980, the Tallis Scholars have recorded on their own label, Gimell Records, established by Peter Phillips and Steve Smith. The label was named after the compositional technique gymel. In accordance with Phillips, 

Soon, there was a critical consensus that, "the Tallis Scholar's recordings are of reliably high quality". Between 1981 and 2006, the group recorded 40 critically acclaimed discs. The recordings covered a repertoire from over 150 years of music history (approximately the years 1450–1600), with some excursions into later repertoire. In 2010, Gimell released its 50th recording, Victoria's Lamentations of Jeremiah. Other notable releases included Gramophone magazine's Record of the Year Award winning disc of Josquin's Missa Pange lingua and Missa La sol fa re mi. In 2011, the ensemble's recording of Allegri's Miserere mei, Deus in Merton College, Oxford in 1980 was named by BBC Music Magazine as one of the "50 Greatest Recordings of All Time". In 2013, the recording of John Taverner's Missa Gloria tibi Trinitas became the number one in the UK Specialist Classical Chart.

Members
According to Phillips, during the 1982-1983 concert season, the group formed its core that was more or less consistent for the next 25 years. Some singers left the Tallis Scholars to develop their successful solo careers; these included Michael Chance, Mark Padmore, James Gilchrist, John Mark Ainsley, and Jeremy White, who became a principal bass at The Royal Opera, Covent Garden.

Accomplishments
The Tallis Scholars ensemble contributed to the wider and greater recognition of choral works of Tallis, Palestrina, Byrd, Tye, and de Victoria, among the other European Renaissance sacred and secular composers, while performing over 1800 concerts around the world and releasing 50 discs. The singers have paved the way for many younger groups such as The Sixteen, The Clerks, The Cardinall's Musick, The Binchois Consort, Trinity Baroque, the Gabrieli Consort, and Octarium. Founded in 1999, the Boston-based early-music a cappella  ensemble Blue Heron is viewed by some critics as a direct influence of the Tallis Scholars on the American early-music scene.

In 2000, the group established the Tallis Scholars Summer Schools, a program providing amateur singers and promising young professionals the opportunity to be coached by Phillips and other members of the ensemble in their specialist repertoire. The program now includes three courses which take place in Oakham in the United Kingdom, Seattle in the United States, and Sydney in Australia.

Various members of the group have scholarly interests in addition to their activities as professional musicians. Phillips has published a scholarly text English Sacred Music 1549–1649. Sally Dunkley, Francis Steele, and Deborah Roberts are all active as music editors and publishers with interests spanning the Renaissance and early Baroque music. Andrew Gant is also organist at the Chapel Royal.

The Tallis Scholars have also performed and recorded Russian Orthodox repertoire, including music by Sergei Rachmaninoff and Igor Stravinsky, and contemporary music, including works by Norbert Moret, Ivan Moody, Arvo Pärt, John Tavener and Eric Whitacre.

Accolades and awards
In 2013, the New York Times described the Tallis Scholars as the "superb a cappella ensemble founded and conducted by Peter Phillips". During their 40 years of concert performances, the group collected a number of recognitions.

In 1987, the Gramophone magazine awarded The Tallis Scholars its Record of the Year, and in 1989 the French magazine Diapason added its Diapason d'Or de l'Année award. In 1991 and 2004, the Gramophone magazine gave The Tallis Scholars its Early Music Award. In 2012, the singers again received the Diapason d'Or de l'Année award, and in 2013 they were elected by a popular vote to the Gramophone's Hall of Fame.

Discography
 1980 Allegri: Miserere/ Palestrina: Missa Papae Marcelli/ Mundy: Vox patris caelestis (#1 HMV Classical Chart, February 1981)
 1981 Palestrina: Missa Benedicta es/ Motet
 1982 Russian Orthodox Music: by Tavener, Rachmaninov, Stravinsky, Bortniansky and anon
 1982 English Madrigals: by Gibbons, Byrd, Weelkes, Morley, Tomkins, etc
 1983 Palestrina: Missa Nigra sum/ Motets by Palestrina, Lhéritier, Victoria and de Silva
 1984 Taverner: Missa Gloria tibi Trinitas/ Leroy Kyrie/ Dum transisset I
 1984 Tavener: Ikon of Light/ Funeral Ikos/ The Lamb
 1985 Tallis: Spem in alium and other Latin-texted works
 1985 Byrd: The Three Masses
 1986 Christmas Carols and Motets
 1986 Palestrina: Missa Brevis/ Missa Nasce la gioja mia
 1986 Tallis: The Complete English Anthems
 1986 Josquin: Missa Pange Lingua/ Missa La Sol Fa Re Mi (Gramophone magazine Record of the Year, 1987)
 1987 Gesualdo: Tenebrae Responsories for Holy Saturday/ Four Marian Motets
 1987 Clemens: Missa Pastores quidnam vidistis/ Motets
 1987 Victoria: Requiem/ Lobo: Versa Est in Luctum
 1987 Byrd: The Great Service/ Anthems
 1988 Sarum Chant: Missa in Gallicantu
 1988 Cornysh: Stabat Mater, Magnificat, Salve regina and other motets and secular songs
 1989 Sheppard: Media Vita
 1989 Josquin: L'homme armé Masses (Diapason d'Or de l'Année, 1989)
 1989 Lassus: Missa Osculetur me/ Motets
 1989 Palestrina: Missa Assumpta est Maria/ Missa Sicut lilum (Gramophone magazine Early Music Award, 1991)
 1990 Music Featured on the South Bank Show (1-disc reissue to accompany the programme)
 1990 Cardoso: Requiem/ Magnificat/ Motets
 1990 Victoria: Tenebrae Responsories
 1991 Isaac: Missa de Apostolis/ Motets
 1991 Tomkins: The Great Service/ Anthems
 1992 Brumel: Missa Et ecce terrae motus (The Earthquake Mass)/ Lamentations/ Magnificat
 1992 D. Lôbo: Requiem/ Missa Vox clamantis
 1992 Tallis: Lamentations of Jeremiah/ Motets and Antiphons
 1993 William Byrd (2-disc reissue to commemorate the 450th anniversary of the composer's birth)
 1993 The Western Wind Masses: by Taverner, Tye and Sheppard
 1994 The Palestrina 400 Collection (4-disc reissue to commemorate the 400th anniversary of the composer's death)
 1994 de Rore: Missa Praeter rerum seriem/ Motets (Gramophone Early Music Award, 1994; Gramophone/Classic FM People's Choice Award, 1994; Zlatá Harmonie Award, Brno, 1995)
 1994 Live in Rome: Allegri and Palestrina (a DVD version is available) (Winner, Cannes Classical Awards at MIDEM, 1995)
 1995 John Taverner (1-disc reissue to commemorate the 450th anniversary of the composer's death)
 1995 White: Lamentations/ Magnificat/ Motets
 1996 Obrecht: Missa Maria Zart
 1997 A Tudor Collection (2-disc reissue)
 1997 Ockeghem: Missa Au travail suis/ Missa De plus en plus and their chansons
 1997 A. Lobo: Missa Maria Magdalene/ Motets
 1997 The Yearning Spirit: Voices of Contemplation (1-disc reissue)
 1998 Lamenta: Lamentations by Ferrabosco, Tallis, White, Brumel, Palestrina
 1998 Tallis Scholars 25th Anniversary (2-disc reissue)
 1998 Tallis Scholars Live in Oxford: Josquin, Obrecht, Taverner, Byrd, Tallis, Mundy
 1998 Tallis: Missa Puer natus (The Christmas Mass)/ Magnificat/ Motets
 1999 The Best of the Renaissance (2-disc reissue)
 2000 Morales: Missa Si bona suscipimus/ Motets (nominated for a Grammy, 2002)
 2001 Allegri: Miserere (reissue of the 1980 release)
 2001 Tavener: Ikon of Light/ Funeral Ikos/ The Lamb (reissue of the 1984 release)
 2001 Gombert: Magnificats 1-4/ chant antiphons
 2002 Gombert: Magnificats 5-8/ chant antiphons
 2002 Tallis: The Complete English Anthems (reissue of the 1986 release)
 2002 Tallis: Lamentations of Jeremiah (reissue of the 1992 release)
 2003 Christmas with the Tallis Scholars (2-disc reissue)
 2003 The Essential Tallis Scholars (2-disc reissue)
 2004 The Tallis Scholars sing Palestrina (2-disc reissue)
 2004 The Tallis Scholars sing Thomas Tallis (2-disc reissue)
 2005 Allegri - Miserere (25th Anniversary Edition of the 1980 release)
 2005 Browne - Music from the Eton Choirbook (Gramophone Early Music Award, 2005)
 2005 Tallis Scholars sing Palestrina (2-disc reissue)
 2005 Victoria/ D. Lobo/ Cardoso: Requiem (2-disc reissue)
 2006 Guerrero: Missa Surge Propera/ Motets
 2006 Palestrina: Missa Benedicta es (25th Anniversary Edition of the 1981 release)
 2006 Playing Elizabeth's Tune: Byrd's Mass for Four Voices/ Motets (DVD version is available)
 2006 Renaissance Giants (2-disc reissue)
 2006 The Tallis Scholars sing Josquin (2-disc reissue)
 2007 Allegri: Miserere/ Palestrina: Missa Papae Marcelli and Motets (New Recordings)
 2007 English Madrigals (25th Anniversary Edition of the 1982 release)
 2007 The Tallis Scholars sing William Byrd (2-disc reissue)
 2008 Josquin: Missa Sine nomine/ Missa Ad fugam
 2008 The Tallis Scholars sing Tudor Church Music - Volume One (2-disc reissue)
 2008 The Tallis Scholars sing Tudor Church Music - Volume Two (2-disc reissue)
 2009 Flemish Masters (2-disc reissue)
 2009 Josquin: Missa Malheur me bat/ Missa Fortuna desperata (Diapason d'Or, 2010; Nominated for a Grammy, 2009)
 2010 Sacred Music in the Renaissance, Vol. 1 (4-disc reissue to celebrate Gimell's 30th anniversary)
 2010 Sacred Music in the Renaissance, Vol. 2 (4-disc reissue to celebrate Gimell's 30th anniversary)
 2010 Sacred Music in the Renaissance, Vol. 3 (4-disc reissue to celebrate Gimell's 30th anniversary)
 2010 Victoria: Lamentations of Jeremiah (Nominated for a Grammy, 2010)
 2011 Josquin: Missa De beata virgine and Missa Ave maris stella (Diapason d'Or de l'Année, 2012)
 2011 The Victoria Collection (3-disc reissue to commemorate the 400th anniversary of the composer's death)
 2012 Mouton: Missa Dictes moy toutes voz pensées/ Motets
 2013 Allegri's Miserere & Palestrina's Missa Papae Marcelli (Pure Audio Blu-ray release of the 2007 disc)
 2013 Whitacre: Sainte-Chapelle (Single track download, not available on CD)
 2013 Taverner: Missa Gloria tibi Trinitas/ Magnificats (Winner, 51st Japan Record Academy Early Music Award, 2013; #1 for several weeks, UK Specialist Classical Chart, 2013)
 2013 Renaissance Radio (2-disc reissue of selected tracks)
 2014 Tavener: Ikon of Light/ Funeral Ikos/ The Lamb (Reissue of the 1984 release to commemorate the death of the composer)
 2015 Arvo Pärt: Tintinnabuli (MusicWeb International Recording of the Year)
 2015 Perfect Polyphony (2-disc reissue of selected tracks)
 2015 John Taverner: Missa Corona spinea/ Dum transisset Sabbatum I and II
 2016 Josquin: Missa Di dadi/ Missa Une mousse de Biscaye
 2018 Josquin: Missa Gaudeamus/ Missa L'ami Baudichon
 2019 Josquin: Missa Mater Patris/ Bauldeweyn: Missa Da pacem/ Brumel: Mater Patris
 2021 Josquin: Missa Hercules Dux Ferrarie - Missa D'ung aultre amer - Missa Faysant regretz

See also
 Thomas Tallis

References

External links

Gimell Recordings
Bibliography by EBSCO

British early music ensembles
Early music choirs
British choirs
Musical groups established in 1973
Medieval musical groups
Thomas Tallis